James Millsopp Melrose (born 7 October 1958) is a Scottish retired professional footballer who played as a striker. Melrose made nearly 400 appearances in the Scottish and English Football Leagues between 1975 and 1990, scoring nearly 100 goals.

Playing career
Born in Glasgow, Melrose played for Eastercraigs, Partick Thistle, Leicester City, Coventry City, Celtic, Wolverhampton Wanderers, Manchester City, Charlton Athletic, Leeds United, Shrewsbury Town and Macclesfield Town. He made eight appearances for the Scotland under-21 team, scoring two goals.

He holds Charlton Athletic's record for their fastest ever goal.

Later career
On 12 June 2009, it was announced that a consortium headed by Melrose was interested in buying Stockport County.

As of December 2014, Melrose was working as the Chief Scout for Bolton Wanderers.

References

1958 births
Living people
Scottish footballers
Partick Thistle F.C. players
Leicester City F.C. players
Coventry City F.C. players
Celtic F.C. players
Wolverhampton Wanderers F.C. players
Manchester City F.C. players
Charlton Athletic F.C. players
Leeds United F.C. players
Shrewsbury Town F.C. players
Macclesfield Town F.C. players
Scottish Football League players
English Football League players
Bolton Wanderers F.C. non-playing staff
Scotland under-21 international footballers
Association football forwards